"The Pre-persons" is a science fiction short story by American writer Philip K. Dick. It was first published in Fantasy and Science Fiction magazine, October 1974.

The story was an anti-abortion response to Roe v. Wade. Dick imagines a future where the United States Congress has decided that abortion is legal until the soul enters the body. The specific instant is defined by the administration, at present the moment a person has the ability to perform simple algebraic calculations (around the age of 12).

The main protester — a former Stanford mathematics major — demands to be taken to the abortion center, since he claims to have forgotten all his algebra.

External links
Page at Internet Speculative Fiction Database

1974 short stories
Abortion in fiction
Short stories by Philip K. Dick
Works originally published in The Magazine of Fantasy & Science Fiction